Portrait of an American Girl is an album by Judy Collins, released in 2005.

Track listing
"Singing Lessons" (Collins) - 4:05
"That Song About the Midway" (Joni Mitchell) - 4:09
"Can't Cry Hard Enough" (Marvin Etzioni, David Williams) - 3:18
"You Can't Buy Love" (Collins) - 3:13
"Pacing the Cage" (Bruce Cockburn) - 4:02
"Sally Go 'Round the Roses" (Abner Spector) - 3:27
"Voyager" (Collins) - 3:01
"Drops of Jupiter (Tell Me)" (Colin, Hotchkiss, Monihan, Stafford, Underwood) - 4:03
"Wedding Song (Song for Louis)" (Collins) - 3:51
"Checkmate" (Collins) - 6:07
"Liberté" (John Bettis, Steve Dorff) - 3:08
"Lincoln Portrait" (Aaron Copland) - 7:13
"How Can I Keep from Singing?" (Collins, Robert Lowry, Pete Seeger) - 3:53

Personnel
Judy Collins – vocals, guitar, piano, arranger, narrator
Gary Anderson – synthesizer, arranger
Tony Beard – drums
Hugh McCracken – guitar
Lee Musiker – piano
Zev Katz – bass
Russell Walden – piano, keyboards, arranger
Johnson Flucker – arranger, conductor

Production notes
Produced by Judy Collins and Alan Silverman
Engineered by Alan Silverman, Arnold Mischkulnig, Roy Hendrickson
Mixed by Alan Silverman
Cover photo by Annie Leibovitz

Judy Collins albums
2005 albums